Stephenville High School, or SHS, is a public high school located in Stephenville, Texas and classified as a 4A school by the University Interscholastic League.  It is part of the Stephenville Independent School District located in central Erath County. In 2015, the school was rated "Met Standard" by the Texas Education Agency.

Athletics
The Stephenville Yellow Jackets compete in the following sports 

Cross Country, Volleyball, Football, Basketball, Powerlifting, Soccer, Golf, Tennis, Track, Softball & Baseball

SHS has been one of the most successful football programs in the state of Texas in recent years. Though it did not make the playoffs from 1952 to 1989, the arrival of Art Briles helped turn the program around. Under Briles, the Yellow Jackets advanced to the playoffs from 1989 until his departure after the 1999 season, winning four state titles (1993, 1994, 1998, 1999) along the way. The 1998 team posted a then national record 8,650 yards of total offense and still holds the third and fourth positions on the national all-time list. Since Briles left for the collegiate ranks, Stephenville has continued to make the playoffs (with the exception of 2003) 

Stephenville won their 5th state title in 2012 under head coach Joe Gillespie (a former player and coach under Art Briles), and their 6th state title in 2021 under head coach Sterling Doty, also a former Yellow Jacket.

State titles
Girls Basketball - 
1968(3A)
Football - 
1993(4A), 1994(4A), 1998(4A/D2), 1999(4A/D2), 2012 (3A/D1), 2021 (4A/D1)
Volleyball - 
2003(4A)
Girls Soccer 
2017(4A), 2019 (4A)

Notable alumni
 Hugh Wolfe, 1930, American football fullback for the New York Giants
 Branndon Stewart, 1993, American football quarterback at the Texas A&M University
 Kelan Luker, American football player and rock musician and a current American football coach
 Kevin Kolb, 2003, American football quarterback for the Arizona Cardinals, attended the University of Houston
 Jevan Snead, 2006, American football quarterback at the University of Mississippi
 Cody Davis, 2008, American football safety at Texas Tech University
 Brock Holt, 2006, American baseball infielder for Boston Red Sox
 Jarrett Stidham, 2015, American football quarterback for the Las Vegas Raiders formerly the New England Patriots and previously for Auburn University
 Shelby Slawson, Republican member of the Texas House of Representatives from District 59 (2021-Present)
Luke McCollum, 1979, retired Vice Admiral and former Chief of the Naval Reserve (2016-2020)

References

External links
Stephenville ISD

Schools in Erath County, Texas
Public high schools in Texas